Marko Konatar (born 25 March 2000) is a Serbian professional footballer who plays as a full-back for Serbian club Železničar Pančevo.

Personal life 
On 22 June 2020 he tested positive for COVID-19.

Career statistics

Honours
Grafičar Beograd
 Serbian League Belgrade: 2018–19

Red Star Belgrade
 Serbian SuperLiga: 2019–20

References

External links
 

2000 births
Living people
Association football defenders
Serbian footballers
Serbian First League players
Red Star Belgrade footballers
RFK Grafičar Beograd players
FK Inđija players
Serbian SuperLiga players
Footballers from Belgrade